The Rouen School (L'École de Rouen) is a term used for artists or artisans born or working in Rouen, or for all artistic products from Rouen, such as Rouen faience of the 16th to 18th centuries. 

The term was first used in 1902 by Arsène Alexandre in his catalogue to an exhibition by Joseph Delattre in the galerie Durand-Ruel in Paris. Alexandre used it to refer to Joseph Delattre, Léon-Jules Lemaître, Charles Angrand and Charles Frechon, four Post-Impressionist artists interested in Neo-Impressionism (and particularly Seurat's pointillism) towards the end of the 1880s. Alexandre also used the term for a second generation of l'École de Rouen, including Robert Antoine Pinchon and Pierre Dumont among others, in relation to Fauvism and Cubism.

Works

Representatives 

Charles Angrand
Édouard de Bergevin
Léonard Bordes
Georges Bradberry
Marcel Couchaux
Georges Cyr
Joseph Delattre
Gaston Duhamel
Pierre Dumont
Alfred Dunet
Charles Frechon
Michel Frechon
Isabelle de Ganay
Narcisse Guilbert
Narcisse Hénocque
Madelaine Hippolyte
Pierre Hodé
Magdeleine Hue
Albert Lebourg
Raimond Lecourt
Léon-Jules Lemaître
Suzanne Léon
Maurice Louvrier
Pierre Le Trividic
Gaston Loir
Maurice Louvrier
Hyppolite Madelaine
Albert Malet
Paul Mascart
Robert Antoine Pinchon
Raymond Quibel
René Sautin
Adrien Segers
Jean Thieulin
Eugène Tirvert
Maurice Vaumousse
Henri Vignet
Jean Charles Contel

Bibliography 
L'École de Rouen, Rouen, BDS, coll. « La Vie de Rouen », 1972, 236 p.
L'École de Rouen, in abc antiquités beaux-arts curiosités, no 188, June 1980
François Lespinasse (preface by François Bergot), L'École de Rouen, Sotteville-lès-Rouen, Rouen-Offset, 1980, 221 p.
Caroline Larroche, 7 peintres de l'école de Rouen, Paris, Galerie Alain Letailleur, 1990, broché, 184 p.
François Lespinasse, L'École de Rouen, Lecerf, Rouen, 1995
François Lespinasse, La Normandie vue par les peintres, Edita, Lausanne, 1988
L'École de Rouen de l'impressionnisme à Marcel Duchamp 1878-1914, Musée des Beaux-Arts de Rouen, 1996
François Lespinasse, Rouen, paradis des peintres, 2003
François Lespinasse, Journal de l'École de Rouen 1877-1945, 2006
L'École de Rouen, de l'impressionnisme au cubisme, soixante ans de modernité en Normandie, Pont-Audemer, Musée Canel, 2008

See also
Société Normande de Peinture Moderne
Section d'Or

Notes

External links 
Exhibition on the School
 Une ville pour l’impressionnisme : Monet, Pissarro et Gauguin à Rouen. Dossier pédagogique, Rouen, Musée des Beaux-Arts, 2010.
 Wally Findlay Galleries International
 Site of the Amis de l'École de Rouen
 Agence photographique de la réunion des Musées nationaux

School
French art movements
Post-Impressionism
French artist groups and collectives